The following human polls make up the 2011 NCAA Division I men's baseball rankings for the 2011 NCAA Division I baseball season.  The USAToday/ESPN Coaches Poll is voted on by a panel of 31 Division I baseball coaches.  The Baseball America poll is voted on by staff members of the Baseball America magazine.  These polls rank the top 25 teams nationally.  Collegiate Baseball and the National Collegiate Baseball Writers Association rank the top 30 teams nationally.

Legend

USA Today/ESPN Coaches' Poll

Baseball America

Collegiate Baseball

NCBWA

References

 
College baseball rankings in the United States